Dmytro Hordiyenko (born 2 March 1983) is a professional Ukrainian football striker who played for FC Lviv in the Ukrainian Premier League. He moved to FC Lviv from Enerhetyk Burshtyn during the 2008 summer transfer season.

External links
Profile on Football Squads

1983 births
Living people
Footballers from Dnipro
Ukrainian footballers
FC Nafkom Brovary players
FC Podillya Khmelnytskyi players
FC Spartak Ivano-Frankivsk players
FC Lviv players
Association football forwards